The president of the Chamber of Deputies was the presiding officer of the lower house of the Cortes Gerais, the legislature of the Kingdom of Portugal during most of the constitutional monarchy period.

Sources 

Portugal